Eric Reynolds (born May 11, 1983 in Bradenton, Florida) is an American professional mixed martial artist who last competed in 2018. A professional since 2007, he has fought in Bellator, the World Series of Fighting, and Absolute Championship Berkut.

Mixed martial arts career
Reynolds made his debut for Bellator Fighting Championships, competing in their lightweight division tournament. Eric had his first fight in the tournament against Thomas Schulte. Reynolds ended up defeating Thomas via TKO at the end of the first round. Reynolds's second fight in the tournament was against number three lightweight fighter, Eddie Alvarez, the bout was at Bellator 5. In the start of the third round, Reynolds gave up his back and was submitted by rear naked choke.

Reynolds fought Jorge Masvidal at Bellator 12, both fighters agreed to a catchweight bout of 160 lbs. Reynolds lost after a third round rear naked choke submission.

He fought Greg Loughran at the event Art of Fighting: Sauer vs. Cruz and won via TKO in the first round.

On October 17, he fought one of Peru's top unsigned fighters, Ivan Iberico at Night of Battle 1. The fight was back and forth with Reynolds showing great submission defense after being put into numerous submission holds. The fight end with Eric knocking out Iberico with a down kick that the referee as well as the crowd thought was an illegal stomp. The crowd was not pleased by Reynold's move and began booing and throwing items into the cage.

Eric was in talks with the Japan based promotion, DREAM. However, for unknown reasons a contract never materialized. He then moved out to Coconut Creek, Florida to train full-time with the American Top Team. He also defeated IFL vet, Travis Cox, at Art of Fighting 8 in May. On December 4, 2010, Reynolds was scheduled to fight Korean fighter, Seung Hwan Bang, but Bang was forced out of the bout. He was replaced by UFC veteran Rob Emerson. Reynolds lost the fight by split decision in a fight that most thought Reynolds won.

Eric most recently has seen success in XFC cage accumulating 3 straight wins. Since signing his XFC contract Eric has faced top opponents like Brazilian jiu-jitsu Black Belt Jonatas Novaes, American Top Team striking coach Luciano Dos Santos and Blackzilian team member Lorenzo Borgomeo. 
Eric fought Nick Newell for the vacant XFC lightweight championship belt on December 7, 2012 in Nashville, TN.  He was submitted in the first round via rear naked choke.

Championships and accomplishments 
Cage MMA
Cage Lightweight Championship (One time)

Mixed martial arts record 

|-
| Loss
| align=center| 18–10
| Anton Kuivanen
| Decision (unanimous)
| Cage 31
| 
| align=center|3
| align=center|5:00
| Helsinki, Finland
| 
|-
| Loss
| align=center| 18–9
| Jorge Patino
| Decision (unanimous)
| WSOF 15
| 
| align=center|3
| align=center|5:00
| Tampa, Florida, United States
|
|-
| Loss
| align=center| 18–8
| Musa Khamanaev
| KO (punch)
| ACB 10: Coliseum Time
| 
| align=center|1
| align=center|3:54
| Grozny, Russia
|
|-
| Loss
| align=center| 18–7
| Dom O'Grady
| Submission (rear-naked choke)
| XFC 27: Frozen Fury
| 
| align=center|2
| align=center|1:42
| Muskegon, Michigan, United States
|
|-
| Win
| align=center| 18–6
| Anton Kuivanen
| KO (punches)
| Cage 23
| 
| align=center|1
| align=center|0:30
| Vantaa, Finland
| 
|-
| Win
| align=center| 17–6
| Kevin Forant
| Submission (arm-triangle choke)
| XFC 24: Collision Course
| 
| align=center|1
| align=center|4:13
| Tampa, Florida, United States
| 
|-
|-
| Loss
| align=center| 16–6
| Nick Newell
| Submission (rear-naked choke)
| XFC 21: Night of Champions II
| 
| align=center|1
| align=center|1:22
| Nashville, Tennessee, United States
| 
|-
| Win
| align=center| 16–5
| Lorenzo Borgomeo
| Submission (guillotine choke)
| XFC 20: High Octane
| 
| align=center|2
| align=center|3:58
| Knoxville, Tennessee, United States
|Catchweight (160 lbs) bout.
|-
| Win
| align=center| 15–5
| Luciano dos Santos
| Decision (unanimous)
| XFC 17: Apocalypse
| 
| align=center|3
| align=center|5:00
| Jackson, Tennessee, United States
|
|-
| Win
| align=center| 14–5
| Jonatas Novaes
| Decision (unanimous)
| XFC 15: Tribute
| 
| align=center|3
| align=center|5:00
| Tampa, Florida, United States
|
|-
| Loss
| align=center| 13–5
| Rob Emerson
| Decision (split)
| Art of Fighting 10: Blackout
| 
| align=center|3
| align=center|5:00
| Estero, Florida, United States
|
|-
| Win
| align=center| 13–4
| Travis Cox
| Submission (guillotine choke) 
| Art of Fighting 8: Fury 
| 
| align=center|2
| align=center|1:45
| Estero, Florida, United States
|
|-
| Loss
| align=center| 12–4
| Ivan Iberico
| DQ (illegal axe kick)
| NDC 1: Peru vs. American Top Team
| 
| align=center|2
| align=center|4:58
| San Borja District, Peru
|
|-
| Win
| align=center| 12–3
| Greg Loughran 
| TKO (punches)
| Art of Fighting: Sauer vs. Cruz
| 
| align=center|1
| align=center|1:54
| Tampa, Florida, United States
|
|-
| Loss
| align=center| 11–3
| Jorge Masvidal
| Submission (rear-naked choke)
| Bellator 12
| 
| align=center|3
| align=center|3:33
| Hollywood, Florida, United States
| 
|-
| Loss
| align=center| 11–2
| Eddie Alvarez
| Submission (rear-naked choke)
| Bellator 5
| 
| align=center|3
| align=center|1:30
| Dayton, Ohio, United States
| 
|-
| Win
| align=center| 11–1
| Thomas Schulte
| KO (head kick and punches) 
| Bellator 2
| 
| align=center|1
| align=center|4:17
| Uncasville, Connecticut, United States
| 
|-
| Win
| align=center| 10–1
| Jose Figueroa
| Submission (guillotine choke)
| Revolution Fight Club 3
| 
| align=center|1
| align=center|1:19
| Miami, Florida, United States
|
|-
| Loss
| align=center| 9–1
| Luis Palomino
| KO (punch)
| G-Force Fights: Bad Blood
| 
| align=center|1
| align=center|0:38
| Miami, Florida, United States
|
|-
| Win
| align=center| 9–0
| Damian Vitale
| KO (punch)
| WFC 7: Lock Down 
| 
| align=center|1
| align=center|1:00
| Atlantic City, New Jersey, United States
|
|-
| Win
| align=center| 8–0
| York Ash
| Submission (rear-naked choke)
| WFC 6: Battle in the Bay 
| 
| align=center|1
| align=center|3:07
| Tampa, Florida, United States
|
|-
| Win
| align=center| 7–0
| Brent Rose
| TKO (punches)
| Miami Vale Tudo 
| 
| align=center|1
| align=center|1:45
| Miami, Florida, United States
|
|-
| Win
| align=center| 6–0
| Schon Ellis
| Submission (rear-naked choke)
| Ultimate Gladiator Championship 
| 
| align=center|1
| align=center|1:20
| Miami, Florida, United States
|
|-
| Win
| align=center| 5–0
| Carlos Gonzalez
| Submission (guillotine choke)
| Rage in the Cage 101
| 
| align=center|1
| align=center|3:34
| Fort Lauderdale, Florida, United States
|
|-
| Win
| align=center| 4–0
| Adron Morrison
| TKO (punches)
| WFC 4: Cage Wars
| 
| align=center|1
| align=center|0:37
| Tallahassee, Florida, United States
|
|-
| Win
| align=center| 3–0
| John Tribby
| Submission (rear-naked choke)
| WFC 3: Turf Wars III
| 
| align=center|1
| align=center|0:22
| Tampa, Florida, United States
|
|-
| Win
| align=center| 2–0
| Daniel Costell
| KO (punches)
| WFC 2: Turf Wars II  	
| 
| align=center|1
| align=center|1:13
| Tampa, Florida, United States
|
|-
| Win
| align=center| 1–0
| Shane Ouimette
| TKO (punches)
| WFC 1: Turf Wars I
| 
| align=center|1
| align=center|2:40
| Tampa, Florida, United States
|

References

External links

1986 births
Living people
American male mixed martial artists